KOSB (105.1 FM) is a radio station licensed to Perry, Oklahoma, United States. The station is currently owned by Team Radio, L.L.C.

References

External links

OSB
Sports radio stations in the United States